WYRQ-FM (92.1 FM) is a radio station  broadcasting a Country Music format. Licensed to Little Falls, Minnesota, United States, the station serves the Morrison County, Minnesota, area. WYRQ-FM is located in a studio at 16405 Haven Road, with its two sister stations.

The station is currently owned by Little Falls Radio Corporation, and includes news programming from CNN Radio.

References

External links
 Old Live Stream Link

Radio stations in St. Cloud, Minnesota
Country radio stations in the United States
Morrison County, Minnesota
Radio stations in Minnesota